James Edward Otten (born July 1, 1951) is a former American professional baseball player, a right-handed pitcher who appeared in 64 games in Major League Baseball for the Chicago White Sox and the St. Louis Cardinals between 1974 and 1981.

Otten was selected by the White Sox in the second round (45th overall) of the 1973 Major League Baseball Draft. He worked in five games (four in relief) for the 1974 ChiSox, then briefly appeared in two games each as a reliever for the 1975–1976 White Sox during subsequent recalls from the minors. After spending all of 1977 at Triple-A, he was traded that December to the Cardinals' organization.

The Cardinals promoted him from their top affiliate, the Springfield Redbirds, in May 1980 and he worked in 55 games for St. Louis during the next two seasons. He earned his only MLB victory on May 14, 1981, when he pitched a scoreless eighth inning of relief against the Houston Astros. When he entered the game, the Cardinals trailed 6–3, but in the top of the ninth inning, they rallied for four runs to take the lead, and Baseball Hall of Fame closer Bruce Sutter nailed down the save for a 7–6 St. Louis triumph.

As a Major Leaguer, Otten allowed 150 hits and 67 bases on balls in 118⅔ innings pitched, with 75 strikeouts. Of his 64 appearances, all but five came in relief.

References

External links

1951 births
Living people
Arizona State Sun Devils baseball players
Arkansas Travelers players
Baseball players from Montana
Chicago White Sox players
Denver Bears players
Knoxville Sox players
Iowa Oaks players
Major League Baseball pitchers
Mesa Thunderbirds baseball players
St. Louis Cardinals players
St. Petersburg Cardinals players
Springfield Redbirds players
People from Lewistown, Montana